The Da Lat tube-nosed bat (Murina harpioloides) is a species of vesper bats (Vespertilionidae). It is found in Vietnam, on the Da Lat plateau.

References

Murininae
Mammals of Vietnam
Mammals described in 2008
Bats of Southeast Asia